Gert Dockx (born 4 July 1988) is a former Belgian professional road bicycle racer who rode for UCI ProTour team .

Career achievements

Major results

2010
 7th Hel van het Mergelland
2012
 6th Druivenkoers Overijse
2013
 1st Stage 7 La Tropicale Amissa Bongo
2016
 7th Grand Prix Pino Cerami
 8th Overall Tour of Turkey

Grand Tour general classification results timeline

References

External links

Official Profile
Cycling archives Profile

1988 births
Living people
Belgian male cyclists
Sportspeople from Turnhout
Cyclists from Antwerp Province